Henning Gronemann (born Henning Jensen, 26 December 1929 – 6 January 2016 ) was a Danish amateur football (soccer) player, who played for BK Frem in Denmark. He was the top goalscorer of the 1955 Danish football championship. He played one game for the Denmark national football team in 1954, and also played for the Denmark national under-21 football team.

References

External links 
 Danish national team profile
 Haslund.info profile

1929 births
2016 deaths
Boldklubben Frem players
Danish men's footballers
Denmark under-21 international footballers
Denmark international footballers
Association football forwards